Events in the year 1876 in Belgium.

Incumbents
Monarch: Leopold II
Head of government: Jules Malou

Events

 20 April – Leopold I's mortal remains transferred to the crypt of the Church of Our Lady of Laeken
 22 May – Provincial elections
 13 June – Partial legislative election
 12 September – Brussels Geographic Conference opens, leading to the foundation of the International African Association
 27 September – Opening of the International Congress of Hygiene and Life-Saving Equipment in Brussels, as part of the International Exhibition of Hygiene.

Publications
Periodicals
 Bulletins de l'Académie royale des sciences, des lettres et des beaux-arts de Belgique, 45 (Brussels, F. Hayez).
 Revue de Belgique, 23.
 Revue de l'horticulture belge et étrangère, 2.

Other
 Léon d'Andrimont, La coopération ouvrière en Belgique.

Art and architecture
Buildings
 Oostakker Basilica completed

Births
 1 March
 Henri de Baillet-Latour, IOC president (died 1942)
 Maurice Emile Marie Goetghebuer, entomologist (died 1962)
 7 April – Jules Degeetere, cyclist (died 1957)
 26 June – Armand Renier, geologist (died 1951)
 16 July – Victor van Strydonck de Burkel, general (died 1961)
 2 August – Julien Lootens, cyclist (died 1942)
 19 August – Oscar de Somville, Olympic rower (died 1938)
 8 September – Thomas Braun, poet (died 1961)
 12 September – Flor Alpaerts, composer (died 1954)
 26 September – Georges Lebacq, painter (died 1950)
 18 October – Charles van den Bussche, Olympic sailor (died 1958)
 17 November – Joseph Van De Meulebroeck, politician (died 1958)
 16 December – Rodolphe Seeldrayers, FIFA president (died 1955)

Deaths
 7 January – Marie Thérèse Haze (born 1782), religious foundress
 16 April – Auguste de Peellaert (born 1793), soldier and artist
 17 April – Adolphe Pierre Sunaert (born 1825), artist and teacher
 9 May – Louis van Houtte (born 1810), horticulturalist
 23 May – Victor de Buck (born 1817), Jesuit
 23 August – Giovanni Inchindi (born 1798), opera singer
 29 October – Jacques Gregoir (born 1817), composer

References

 
Belgium
Years of the 19th century in Belgium
1870s in Belgium
Belgium